The following is a list of Georgia Tech Yellow Jackets men's basketball head coaches. There have been 14 head coaches of the Yellow Jackets in their 108-season history.

Georgia Tech's current head coach is Damon Stoudamire. He was hired in March 2023, replacing Josh Pastner, who was fired after the 2022–23 season.

References

Georgia Tech

Georgia Tech Yellow Jackets men's basketball coaches